Aridoplaca is a fungal genus in the family Teloschistaceae. It is a monotypic genus, containing the single saxicolous (rock-dwelling) squamulose lichen species Aridoplaca peltata, found in South America. The genus was circumscribed in 2021 by Karina Wilk, Maciej Pabijan, and Robert Lücking, following molecular phylogenetic analysis that showed the species occupies a distinct lineage in the subfamily Xanthorioideae of the Teloschistaceae. The species epithet peltata refers to the squamulose and  thallus, while the genus name refers to the habitat of the lichen, which occurs in arid areas of Bolivia and Peru.

References

Teloschistales
Lichen genera
Teloschistales genera
Taxa described in 2021
Taxa named by Robert Lücking